The Houlton–Woodstock Border Crossing is a border crossing and port of entry on the Canada–United States border, east of Houlton, Maine, and west of Woodstock, New Brunswick. The U.S. border station is often called Houlton Station. Around 2004, Canada began calling its border station Woodstock Road. It is the easternmost land border crossing between the two countries.

The border crossing marks the northern terminus of Interstate 95, and the western terminus of New Brunswick Route 95. This crossing was established on October 25, 1985, upon the completion of New Brunswick Route 95.  At that time, the old crossing located on U.S. Route 2 immediately to the south was permanently closed.

It is a time zone boundary between Eastern Time Zone and Atlantic Time Zone.

See also
 List of Canada–United States border crossings

References

1985 establishments in Maine
1985 establishments in New Brunswick
Buildings and structures in Houlton, Maine
Canada–United States border crossings
Interstate 95
Woodstock, New Brunswick